The first season of the American comedy television series Gilligan's Island was shown in the United States on September 26, 1964 and concluded on June 12, 1965 on CBS. The season introduced the comic adventures of seven castaways as they attempted to survive and escape from an island on which they had been shipwrecked. Most episodes revolved around the dissimilar castaways' conflicts and their failed attempts—invariably Gilligan's fault—to escape their plight. The season originally aired on Saturdays at 8:30-9:00 pm (EST).

Production 
Executive producers for the first season included William Froug and series creator Sherwood Schwartz. Filming took place at the CBS Radford Studios complex in Studio City, Los Angeles California. This complex contained 17 sound stages, as well as special effects and prop departments. On one stage, a lagoon had been constructed by the production company "at great expense". According to Bob Denver, the crew would spend half their days filming scenes in the lagoon. Shots and sequences involving the characters were filmed in a different soundstage. After the series was cancelled, the show's lagoon was not dismantled, and it remained in place until 1995, when it was converted into a parking lot.

Cast 
The series employed an ensemble cast of seven main actors and actresses. Denver played the role of the titular First Mate Gilligan, a bumbling, naive, and accident-prone crewman who often messes up the castaways chances of rescue. Alan Hale, Jr. portrayed The Skipper, captain of the S.S. Minnow and the older friend of Gilligan. Jim Backus appeared as Thurston Howell III, a millionaire, and Natalie Schafer played his wife, Eunice Lovelle Wentworth Howell. Tina Louise played the role of Ginger Grant, a famous movie star. Russell Johnson portrayed Professor Roy Hinkley, Ph.D., a high school science teacher who often used his scientific background for ways to get the castaways off the island. Dawn Wells played Mary Ann Summers, a wholesome farm girl from Kansas. Charles Maxwell was the uncredited voice of the radio announcer, to whom the castaways would often listen.

Broadcast history 
The season aired Saturdays from 8:30-9:00 pm (EST) on CBS. It was the only season filmed in black-and-white.

DVD release 
The DVD was released by Warner Home Video, along with the pilot episode as a bonus episode.

Episodes

Footnotes

References 

 
 
 
 
 

Gilligan's Island (season 1)